Carlos Falcó y Fernández de Córdoba, 5th Marquess of Griñón, GE (3 February 1937 – 20 March 2020) was a Spanish peer, businessman and socialite. He was best known by his title of Marquess of Griñón despite later inheriting a much older title, Marquess of Castel-Moncayo, which has a Grandeeship attached.

Life and family 
Born at Palacio de las Dueñas in Seville, he was the eldest son of Manuel Falcó y Escandón, 9th Duke of Montellano, 11th Marquess of Castel-Moncayo, 9th Marquess of Pons, Grandee of Spain, and his wife Hilda Fernández de Córdoba y Mariátegui, notable huntress, 12th Marchioness of Mirabel, 3rd Countess of Santa Isabel, 10th Countess of Berantevilla. His maternal grandfather was Joaquín Fernández de Córdoba y Osma, 8th Duke of Arión, who was president of Real Club de la Puerta de Hierro between 1896 and 1901.

Falcó succeeded to the Marquessate of Griñón in 1955, when his maternal grandfather ceded the title to him. In 1978, Falcó inherited the Marquessate of Castel-Moncayo after the death of his father, thus becoming a Grandee of Spain.

He managed the family estate-bottled wine brand "Marqués de Griñón", which earned him high recognition. The American magazine Wine Spectator listed it in 2014 as one of the greatest wines in the world.

As the husband of Isabel Preysler between 1980 and 1985, Falcó became the stepfather of her children, including Julio Iglesias Jr. and Enrique Iglesias.

Issue 
Children with Jeannine Girod y del Avellanal:
 Manuel Falcó y Girod, 13th Marquess of Castel-Moncayo (b. 1964)
 Alejandra Falcó y Girod, 13th Marchioness of Mirabel (b. 1967)

Children with María Isabel Preysler y Arrastía:
 , 6th Marchioness of Griñón (b. 1981)

Children with María de Fátima de la Cierva y Moreno:
 Duarte Falcó y de la Cierva (b. 1994)
 Aldara Falcó y de la Cierva (b. 1997)

Death 
Falcó died on 20 March 2020 in Fundación Jiménez Díaz, a hospital in Madrid, as a result of COVID-19. His son Manuel succeeded to the title of Marquess of Castel-Moncayo, whilst daughter Tamara succeeded to the Griñón title.

Titles 
 12th Marquess of Castel-Moncayo (GE)
 5th Marquess of Griñón

References 

 
|-

1937 births
2020 deaths
People from Seville
Spanish businesspeople
Marquesses of Spain
Grandees of Spain
Catholic University of Leuven (1834–1968) alumni
University of California alumni
Deaths from the COVID-19 pandemic in Spain